The necrobiome has been defined as the community of species associated with decaying corpse remains. The process of decomposition is complex. Microbes decompose cadavers, but other organisms including fungi, nematodes, insects, and larger scavenger animals also contribute. Once the immune system is no longer active, microbes colonizing the intestines and lungs decompose their respective tissues and then travel throughout the body via the blood and lymphatic systems to break down other tissue and bone. During this process, gases are released as a by-product and accumulate, causing bloating. Eventually, the gases seep through the body's wounds and natural openings, providing a way for some microbes to exit from the inside of the cadaver and inhabit the outside. The microbial communities colonizing the internal organs of a cadaver are referred to as the thanatomicrobiome. The region outside of the cadaver that is exposed to the external environment is referred to as the epinecrotic portion of the necrobiome, and is especially important when determining the time and location of death for an individual. Different microbes play specific roles during each stage of the decomposition process. The microbes that will colonize the cadaver and the rate of their activity are determined by the cadaver itself and the cadaver's surrounding environmental conditions.

History 
There is textual evidence that human cadavers were first studied around the third century BC to gain an understanding of human anatomy. Many of the first human cadaver studies took place in Italy, where the earliest record of determining the cause of death from a human corpse dates back to 1286. However, understanding of the human body progressed slowly, in part because the spread of Christianity and other religious beliefs resulted in human dissection becoming illegal. Thus, non-human animals were solely dissected for anatomical understanding until the 13th century when officials realized human cadavers were necessary for a better understanding of the human body. It was not until 1676 that Antonie van Leeuwenhoek designed a lens that made it possible to visualize microbes, and not until the late 18th century when microbes were considered useful in understanding the body after death. Modern sophisticated molecular techniques have made it possible to identify the microbial communities that inhabit and decompose cadavers, but more advanced research is fairly new, and therefore poorly understood. Studying the necrobiome has become increasingly useful in determining the time and cause of death. so more recent research can have crime-solving applications.

Necrobiome applications

Forensic entomology 
Forensic entomology, the study of insects (arthropods) found in decomposing humans is the most popular field of study used in determining the post-mortem interval (PMI). This technique, however, is still new and consistently being improved, and—as such—it can work well with other techniques such as forensic anthropology, though forensic entomology is not as dependable on its own yet. Forensic entomologists often work within the field of crime scene investigations and are a part of the crime scene expert team that analyzes and collects evidence regarding a suspicious death. Typically, the minimum education required for this particular position is a Doctorate in Forensic Science. Forensic entomologists are experts in their field, and thus require a professional certification with the American Board of Forensic Entomology. As another relatively new field, forensic microbiologists, studying the presence of microbes, began investigating ways to determine time and place of death by analyzing the microbes present on the corpse. This would become an integral part of crime solving in later years upon the invention of the microbial clock process.  The microbial timeline in which the body decays has been given the term “microbial clock,” this estimates how long a body has been in a certain place based on microbes present or missing. The succession of bacterial species populating the body after a period of four days is an indicator of minimum time since death (MTD). The presence or absence of maggots, as well as their age, can also be used to determine time of death; If the maggot is only a few days old, then the cadaver could not have been dead for longer than this time.

Microbial forensics 
As the necrobiome deals with the various communities of bacteria and organisms that catalyze the decomposition of plants and animals (See Figure 1), this particular biome is an increasingly vital part of forensic science. The microbes occupying the space underneath and around a decomposing body are unique to it—similar to how fingerprints are exclusively unique to only one person. Using this differentiation, forensic investigators at a crime scene are able to distinguish between burial sites. This would provide concrete factual information about how long the body has been there and the predicted area in which the death possibly occurred. As the progression of research regarding microbial forensics and the necrobiome continues to be refined and improved, the need for new forensic scientists and microbiologists becomes increasingly necessary. When a crime such as murder has transpired, a team of crime scene specialists or forensic science experts are called to the scene to collect evidence and examine the body. These experts range from forensic odontologists to forensic microbiologists (See Figure 2). Together, they can obtain the necessary elements needed in order to properly reconstruct the victim's demise.

Cadavers and carcasses 
One way many people study how bodies decompose is through the use of body farms. There are seven research facilities in the US that are home to body farms:  University of Tennessee in Knoxville, Western Carolina University, Texas State University, Sam Houston State University, Southern Illinois University, Colorado Mesa University, and University of South Florida. These facilities study the decomposition of cadavers in all possible manners of decay, including in open or frozen environments, buried underground, or within cars. Through the study of the cadavers, experts examine the microbial timeline and document what's normal in each stage in the various locations that each body is placed. An experiment was conducted to study the change in the necrobiome within a carcass and they performed it. The experiment was conducted to study the relative abundance of organisms in the necrobiome and the changes that occur during three different stages. For the experiment, they used six dead rabbits purchased from a pet food company. The rabbits were purchased from Kiezebank and exposed on top of a roof at the University of Huddersfield in West Yorkshire, United Kingdom. The rabbits were dead prior to purchase. Three of the rabbits’ fur were removed from the torso to identify any difference in necrobiome abundance. Samples were collected from inside of the mouth, the upper skin of the torso exposed to the air environment, and the bottom skin of the torso that's touched by the soil. Active, advanced, and decay stages were examined, and proteobacteria were the most abundant present, followed by Firmicutes, Bacteroidetes, and Actinobacteria during the active stage of decomposition (Figure 3).  During the advanced stage of decomposition, Proteobacteria decreased from 99.4% to 81.6% in the oral cavity but were most abundant in the non-fur samples. It was distinguished that Firmicutes were the most abundant for the skin samples in both fur and non-fur samples. Finally, Proteobacteria was most abundant in the soil interface during the beginning of decomposition in both fur and non-fur samples. Also, they noted that Actinobacteria was the least abundant in the active stage and decreased even more during the dry stage.

Decomposition 
The manner in which bacteria colonize a cadaver is predictable when examining the time since death. Only recent studies have taken place to determine if bacteria alone can inform the postmortem interval. Bacteria responsible for decomposing cadavers can be difficult to study because the bacteria found on a cadaver varies and changes quickly. Bacteria can be brought to a cadaver by scavengers, air, or water. Other environmental factors like temperature and soil can impact the microbes found on a cadaver. Fortunately, microbial colonization between humans and animals is so similar, that animal models can be used to understand the decomposition process for humans. Human cadavers are used for research, but animal models provide larger sample sizes and produce more controlled studies. Swine models have been used repeatedly to understand the human decomposition process in terrestrial environments. Swine are suitable for studying human decomposition because of their size, sparse hairs, and similar bacteria found in their GI tracts.

Technology and techniques 
An algorithm has been developed to accurately predict time since death with an accuracy of within two days.

Techniques for analyzing the necrobiome have now been coupled with forensic entomology, such as phospholipid fatty acid (PLFA) analysis, total soil fatty acid methyl esters, and DNA profiling. Pig carcasses have also become a tool to understand human microbiology, minimizing the issue of variation that exists when using human cadavers as study subjects. This technology is used to simplify the sample collection into sequences that scientists can read. The simplified sequence of the necrobiome is run through a data bank to match the name of it. Due to the lack of universal algorithm technology, there is a knowledge gap in various platforms across different regions of the world. In order to close that gap, there needs to be an expansion of the technology. However, there are a few obstacles, including identifying needs, research, prototype development, acceptance, and adoption. Overcoming these obstacles would assist many organizations that are involved with forensic science. Also, it would increase the understanding of the necrobiome and growth of developing a successful accurate multi-step experiment. The samples are loaded into a machine to generate and analyze DNA sequences of the microbiome. Algorithms are done in a lab on a computer program to read and match the sequences within the data bank. The results return very quickly within a few minutes to the latest days.

See also 

 Microbiology of decomposition
 Biome
 Human microbiome

References 

Bacteriology
Bacteria and humans
Microbiology
Microbiomes